Miss Rodeo USA is an annual pageant to select the official spokesperson for the International Professional Rodeo Association (IPRA).

On January 16, 2022, Jessie Lynn Nichols was crowned Miss Rodeo USA 2022 at the Lazy E Arena in Guthrie, Oklahoma. The ceremony was held during the 52nd International Finals Rodeo. Nichols hails from Prattville, Alabama. The event occurs annually at the IFR.

Current Miss Rodeo USA 2022
Jessie Lynn Nichols is Miss Rodeo USA for 2022. Nichols is the 57th woman to wear the crown. She is also the 11th woman to hold the title from the Yellowhammer State. She will travel throughout the United States and Canada as the ambassador for the IPRA promoting professional rodeo.

Miss Rodeo USA 2020
Brooke Wallace was Miss Rodeo USA for 2020 and the 55th woman to wear the crown. Hailing from Council Grove, Kansas, she was the first to hold the title from the Sunflower State.

History
The Miss Rodeo USA Association has represented the IPRA for more than five decades. The pageant is open to cowgirls around the nation, who have won the title each January in Oklahoma City, Oklahoma.

Winners
This is a list of women who have won the Miss Rodeo USA crown.

Source:

Miss Teen Rodeo USA
The inaugural Miss Teen Pageant, for ages 13-17, was held mid-July, 2021, at International Finals Youth Rodeo in Shawnee, Oklahoma. Contestants must be able to perform a Horsemanship pattern and ride in a Grand entry. Lana Carter of Crossett, Arkansas, was the winner.

See also

 Miss Rodeo America
 International Professional Rodeo Association

References

External links
Official Site
Miss Rodeo America

Rodeo promoters and managers
Beauty pageants in the United States
Rodeo-affiliated events
Beauty pageants in North America